Sky Farm is America's first permanent naturist community opened on 15 May 1932, in Somerset County, New Jersey by Kurt Barthel. It operates as a private cooperative and is only open to its members.

References

External links

Naturism in the United States
Naturist resorts
Buildings and structures in Somerset County, New Jersey